Elizabeth Bowes (1505 – 1572) was an English Protestant.

Elizabeth Bowes is also the name of:

Elizabeth Bowe (born 1941), American educator and public servant
Elizabeth Bowes-Lyon (1900–2002), wife of King George VI of the United Kingdom